A women's Twenty20 International (T20I) is a 20 overs-per-side cricket match played between two representative side, each with WT20I status as approved by the International Cricket Council (ICC). The first women's T20I match was held in August 2004 between England and New Zealand. The Pakistan national women's cricket team played its first T20I match at the Vineyard, Dublin in 2009, losing to Ireland by 9 wickets.

Since the team made its first appearance in 2009, 51 women have represented Pakistan in T20I cricket. This list includes all players who have played at least one T20I match and is initially arranged in the order of debut appearance. Where more than one player won their first cap in the same match, those players are initially listed alphabetically by last name at the time of debut.

Key

Players
Statistics are correct as of 21 February 2023

WT20I captains

Footnotes

References

External links

Women T20I cricketers
Pakistani
Cricket